Vladimír Kompánek (28 October 1927 in Rajec – 20 January 2011) was a Slovak sculptor and painter. He won the Herder Prize in 1967.

Between 1947 - 1949 he studied at the Slovak Technical University in Bratislava, then from 1949 - 1954 at the College of Fine Arts.

His wooden sculptures draw ideas from the rural environment. Kompánek also creates the concept of "protective deities", symbols which appear in his works. symbols. A frequent motif he uses is a woman and field characters and carnival masks. He is also a maker of wooden toys.

References

1927 births
2011 deaths
People from Rajec
Slovak sculptors
Herder Prize recipients
Slovak University of Technology in Bratislava alumni